The Illyrian Armorials are a group of armorials compiled from mainly fictional medieval coats of arms, among which there can be found several actual coats of arms, during the late 16th to mid 18th century. They are all copies based on alleged lost original of the Ohmučević Armorial, commissioned by Petar Ohmučević (died 1599), a person of Ragusan origin, who went to become an admiral of Spanish court and navy at some point between 1584 and 1594. It is an example of the earliest ("Interconfessional") form of Illyrism idea and notion of so-called "Illyrian Empire", which formed the ideological basis for both the later rise of nationalism in the Balkans among its South Slavs, and the idea of unification.

The armorials combine historical (late medieval) with fictional coats of arms to construct the notion of an "Illyrian Empire". This fictional Empire happened to coincide exactly with the sphere of interest of the Spanish Empire in the Balkans at the time, and hence also Petar's own. Petar Ohmučević personal goal was to confirm his own "Illyrian" noble origins, after he rose to the rank of admiral in the Spanish navy, and in order to qualify for the greater chivalric orders of Hapsburg Spain at the time, for which was necessary to prove descent from eight noble and purely Catholic great-grandparents. Ohmučević was granted the status of nobleman in 1594, which is taken as the terminus ante quem of the armorial. 

Ohmučević's armorial can thus be considered a personal project in inventing and probing one's origin, or even a hoax, as he invented genealogy in order to defraud a Spanish court and qualify for the coveted title. However, its immense influence in becoming the foundation of South Slavic or "Illyrist" heraldry in general, can't be denied. An important source for Ohmučević's heraldic inventions was the Wappenbüchlein by Virgil Solis (1555), which itself contains fictional arms of "foreign kingdoms".

The Illyrian Armorials includes the following armorials, with estimated dates in brackets:

See also
 
Pan-Slavism

References

Bibliography
 
 
 

South Slavic history
Pan-Slavism
Rolls of arms
Illyrian movement